Midhurst is an electoral division of West Sussex in the United Kingdom, and returns one member to sit on West Sussex County Council.

Extent
The division is one of the largest in West Sussex and covers the town of Midhurst; and the villages of Bepton, Chithurst, Didling, Elsted, Iping, Milland, Nyewood, Rake, Rogate, South Harting, Stedham, Treyford, Trotton and Woolbeding.

It comprises the following Chichester District wards: Harting Ward, Midhurst Ward, Rogate Ward and the western part of Stedham Ward; and of the following civil parishes: Bepton, Elsted & Treyford, Harting, Linch, Midhurst, Milland, Rogate, Stedham with Iping, Trotton with Chithurst and Woolbeding with Redford.

Election results

2017 Election
Results of the election held on 4 May 2017:

2013 Election
Results of the election held on 2 May 2013:

2012 By-election
Results of the by-election held on 15 November 2012:

2009 Election
Results of the election held on 4 June 2009:

2005 Election
Results of the election held on 5 May 2005:

References
Election Results - West Sussex County Council

External links
 West Sussex County Council
 Election Maps

Electoral Divisions of West Sussex